Northline Transit Center/HCC station is a station on METRORail Red Line in Houston. It is the northern terminus of the Red Line. It services the Northline Transit Center, located on the west side of the street and the Houston Community College Northline Campus.

Bus connections
All routes connect at the Northline Transit Center.
23 Clay-West 43rd
29 Cullen/Hirsch
36 Kempwood
45 Tidwell
56 Airline/Montrose
79 Irvington
96 Veterans Memorial

External links
 

METRORail stations
Railway stations in the United States opened in 2013
Railway stations in Harris County, Texas